Alyosha's Love is a 1960 Soviet comedy film directed by Georgi Shchukin and Semyon Tumanov.

Plot 
A modest guy, a drilling geologist, loves the beautiful and provocative switchman Zina. The faithful and boundless love of Alyosha gradually awakens her reciprocal feeling, which makes others look with different eyes at the inconspicuous guy.

Cast 
 Leonid Bykov as Alyosha
 Aleksandra Zavyalova as Zina
 Alexey Gribov as Zina's grandfather
 Yuri Belov as Arkady
 Ivan Savkin as Nikolai
 Vladimir Gulyaev	as Sergey
 Ivan Ryzhov as Volkov
 Igor Okhlupin as Zina's boyfriend
 Pyotr Sobolevsky as Belogorov

Production
Leonid Kuravlyov, Anatoly Kuznetsov and  Leonid Kharitonov  auditioned for the role of Alyoshka. Iya Arepina, Lyudmila Gurchenko and  Izolda Izvitskaya auditioned for the role of Zina.

References

External links 
 

1960 films
1960s Russian-language films
Soviet romantic comedy films
1960 romantic comedy films
Mosfilm films
1960 directorial debut films
Soviet teen films